Asbury Methodist Church, also known as Asbury Memorial Church and Asbury Methodist Episcopal Church South, is a historic Methodist church located at Raynham, Robeson County, North Carolina.  It was built in 1861, and is a one-story, timber-frame building in a modest Greek Revival style.  It measures approximately 40 feet by 50 feet and features a prominent, projecting, pedimented front gable supported by five posts.  Adjacent to the church is the contributing cemetery with approximately 200 marked graves.  The oldest grave dates to 1848.

It was added to the National Register of Historic Places in 2009.

References

Methodist churches in North Carolina
Churches on the National Register of Historic Places in North Carolina
Greek Revival church buildings in North Carolina
Churches completed in 1861
19th-century Methodist church buildings in the United States
Buildings and structures in Robeson County, North Carolina
National Register of Historic Places in Robeson County, North Carolina
1861 establishments in North Carolina